The Universal White Brotherhood (UWB) is a religious movement founded in Bulgaria in 1897 by Peter Deunov. It was later established in France in 1937 by Omraam Mikhaël Aïvanhov, one of Deunov's followers.

Their teachings are also known as "Dunovism", after the founder. The group proposes a Christian esoterism, characterized by a number of practices, including prayers, meditation, breathing exercises, yoga of nutrition and paneurhythmy. A person can be both a member of the group and of another religion.

It has two centers located in Sèvres and Fréjus and 2,000 followers in France. It is present in many countries, including Canada, Switzerland and Belgium.

Explanation of name 
"Universal" refers to human's ability to understand universal concepts about life. It speaks to the idea that people can expand their consciousness with these concepts that extend to more than just one person or group.

"White" refers to "the highest spiritual symbol, which is the synthesis of all colors, being the manifestations of the soul’s virtues".  "Brotherhood" is meant to indicate that the UWB's teachings are for every human no matter what community, religion, or group they belong to. The Universal White Brotherhood believes that their teachings are for everyone so that they can expand their consciousness and embrace a virtuous spirituality.

History 
In 1904 Deunov moved to Sofia, Bulgaria. He began to hold weekly Sunday lectures, which continued until his death in 1944.

The school of the UWB was opened in 1922. Paneurhythmy began to develop in the 1930s, and Deunov began taking followers to the Rila Mountains during this decade.

The movement was banned in communist Bulgaria starting in 1944.

In France, the group achieved notability in the media in 1971. 

After the fall of communism in Bulgaria in 1989, UWB was recognized as a religious sect.

The 1995 and 1999 reports established by the Parliamentary Commission on Cults in France, as well as the 1997 reports issued by the Parliamentary Inquiry Commission in Belgium listed the group as a cult.

Beliefs

Solarcentrism 
The Universal White Brotherhood believes in centering oneself around the sun, which contributes to their practice of Surya Yoga. They believe that meditating at sunrise offers a host of physical and spiritual benefits. According to the movement, this practice is valuable given that the Earth and therefore human beings revolve around the sun.

Brotherhood 
The UWB believes that universal brotherhood is "the only solution to the problems of humanity." This brotherhood is described as "human beings working together no longer exclusively for themselves, but for the whole world." This stems from the belief that all people are the children of an universal Creator.

Dualism of human nature 
The Universal White Brotherhood teaches "that all human beings possess two natures, a human nature and a divine nature." The human nature "is composed of the physical and etheric body, the astral body and the mental body," and the divine body "consists of the Causal body or divine wisdom, the Budhic body which is formed of all our purest, most noble feelings and the Atomic body or the higher will." The UWB believes that humans should identify themselves with their divine nature.

Divinity of art 
This is the belief that all human beings are naturally creative, but that art ought to be inspired by the divine rather than by the human. Within UWB thought, humans are considered to be works of art, and perfecting oneself is seen act of creativity.

Spiritual work 
The UWB teaches that "spiritual work is a matter of developing the divine part of yourself which in ordinary life is bullied and smothered by all kinds of occupations and worries. Learn to establish order and harmony in yourself, allow your divine nature to blossom in the light and love." This is accomplished by "bringing heaven into one’s physical body," for example by means of eating, breathing exercises, and prayers.

Appearance 
Members are advised to buy new white loose-fitting clothing. Allowed fabrics include cotton, linen, wool and silk. Members are advised to not wear torn or stained clothing, nor should they have dirty nails or hair.

Methods and practices 

Six of the major methods used by the Universal White Brotherhood to practice and reinforce their beliefs include: meditation, music and singing, eating in silence, respiration, spiritual gymnastics and paneurhythmy.

Meditation 
The Master calls meditation "Surya Yoga" or "Yoga of the Sun" and it is a method that all disciples are encouraged to practice because it is at the heart of the teachings. Meditation is practiced between the Spring and Autumn equinoxes at sunrise. Sunrise is important because it is a time of renewal when the sun's rays help to transform and renew meditators. In meditation, the practitioner concentrates their thoughts and forces on the sun to reinforce their connection with their spirit. Just as the sun is the center of the solar system, through meditation practitioners connect with their spirit, the center of their being. Meditation allows paths of communication to be established through bridges between human's higher and lower natures.

There is also meditation with music and laser meditation. Meditation with music is when brotherhood centers hold collective meditations that start with 10–15 minutes of inspirational music. This music is thought to help practitioners relax and to stimulate the imagination leading to an enrichment of spiritual life and good will. Laser meditation is when everyone concentrates on a single image during intense and silent meditation.

Music and singing 
Meetings begin with the singing of three sacred songs that were composed by Peter Deunov. Omraam Mikhaël Aïvanhov says that music is a way to harmonize one's being with the rest of the community. It helps to establish unity between people and to purify the atmosphere to "disintegrate the darkness". Through song, people are able to transform themselves. While singing, people should concentrate on what they need or want, like health or intelligence, and in the future they might find that they can find these things within themselves.

Eating in silence 
Practitioners eat in silence so they are able to meditate on how their food is grown in nature and by the Creator. By avoiding conversation and focusing on the food, people are able to love their food so that they are able to receive all of its treasures. The idea is that if you love the food you are eating, you will gain more from the experience.

Respiration 
The Brotherhood uses nostril breathing exercises that are often found in Hatha yoga tradition. Breathing is considered a form of nutrition and to fully take in these nutrients, people must hold the air in their lungs. Through respiration, people also draw in forces of light and peace from the world. These methods are used to develop "inner qualities, strengthen the will, calm the nervous system and vitalize the body."

Spiritual gymnastics 
There are six exercises that when performed form an "inner request". The exercises take the shape of gentle and flowing movements and by concentrating on specific movements, people are able to calm their nervous system and create inner harmony. These exercises can also be used to ask for spiritual blessings and to develop individual qualities of balance, vitality, health, and purity. These gymnastics allow people to create balance between themselves and nature that ultimately results in better health.

Paneurhythmy 
Paneurhythmy refers to a circle dance, which was created by Deunov. He referred to it as "the supreme cosmic rhythm". Through this dance people are able to harmonize with the rhythms of the universe. Aïvanhov said, "dancing the paneurhythmy enables you to learn to adapt your thoughts, your sentiments and your actions to the most harmonious rhythms of nature."

Pilgrimage 
Every year some members make a pilgrimage to the Rila Mountains in Bulgaria during the month of August, where they perform paneurhythmy together to celebrate the new year. August 19 is believed to be the beginning of the divine year, and on this day the sun has "a special radiation". Shared lunches, lectures and concerts are also held.

References

External links
 Official site
 Site of the official Bulgarian White Brotherhood

Religious organizations established in the 20th century
New religious movements
Esoteric Christianity
Christianity in Bulgaria
Christianity in France